Musel Pikes is a Luxembourgian basketball club based in Stadtbredimus. The club was founded in 2000 after the merger between BC Stadtbredimus and Rief Remich.

Honours
Total League
Runners-up (4): 2007–08, 2008–09, 2015–16, 2016–17
Luxembourg Cup
Winners (1): 2004
Runners-up (4): 2003, 2004, 2005, 2006

References

External links
Official website

Basketball teams in Luxembourg
Basketball teams established in 2000